Abtsrodaer Kuppe is a mountain of Hesse, Germany. It is close to the summit of Wasserkuppe and belongs to the Rhön Mountains. 

Mountains of Hesse
Mountains and hills of the Rhön